Frederik Ferdinand Helsted (March 18, 1809 – December 11, 1875) was a Danish painter and drawing master.

Biography
Helsted was born in Copenhagen, Denmark. He was the son of Johan Helsted and Ane Marie Salathee. 
From 1834 to 1837 he studied at the Royal Danish Academy of Fine Arts. He conducted study trips to Düsseldorf (1841),  Nice, Florence and Rome (1844–45). In 1845 he set up a drawing school in Copenhagen which he ran for 30 years. After 1849, he abandoned his painting career and concentrated on drawing lessons.
 
In 1841, he married Anna Christiane Vilhelmine Olsen (1815-1889). He was the father of painter Axel Helsted (1847-1907).  He was buried at the Holmens Cemetery  in Copenhagen.

References

Other sources
Biography at the Dansk biografisk Lexikon (in Danish)

19th-century Danish painters
Danish male painters
Artists from Copenhagen
Royal Danish Academy of Fine Arts alumni
1809 births
1875 deaths
Burials at Holmen Cemetery
19th-century Danish male artists